C'mon We're Taking Over is the third studio album by Australian pop group Hush. Released in November 1974, the album peaked at No. 26 and was certified double gold on the Australian charts.

Track listing

Charts

References 

1974 albums
Hush (band) albums